Function field may refer to:
Function field of an algebraic variety
Function field (scheme theory)
Algebraic function field
Function field sieve
Function field analogy